Ladies First may also refer to:

Film
Ladies First, a 1918 film directed by Hampton Del Ruth
Ladies First, a 2013 film Hebrew-language stand-up comedy film including Riki Blich
Ladies First, a 2014 film Hindi-language film directed by Ashok Mehta
Ladies First (film), a 2017 Indian documentary on the life of archer Deepika Kumari

Television
"Ladies First", a 2013 TV episode of The Ultimate Fighter
"Ladies First", a 2005 TV episode of the Music Makers

Music
Ladies First (group), a UK garage group
Ladies First (Ms Scandalous album)
Verizon Ladies First Tour, a concert tour
Ladies First, a 1918 musical at the Broadhurst Theatre
Ladies First!, a classical album of Haydn arias by Lisa Larsson
"Ladies First", a song by Queen Latifah and Monie Love from All Hail the Queen

Other uses
Ladies First: Revelations of a Strong Woman, a 2000 memoir by Queen Latifah
Ladies First Cup, an invitational international women's football competition held in Calais, France

See also

 
 
First Ladies
First Lady (disambiguation)
Lady (disambiguation)
First (disambiguation)